Félix Mata (30 January 1951 – 26 April 2018) was a Venezuelan sprinter. He competed in the men's 100 metres at the 1972 Summer Olympics.

References

External links
 

1951 births
2018 deaths
Athletes (track and field) at the 1971 Pan American Games
Athletes (track and field) at the 1972 Summer Olympics
Venezuelan male sprinters
Olympic athletes of Venezuela
Place of birth missing
Central American and Caribbean Games medalists in athletics
Pan American Games competitors for Venezuela
20th-century Venezuelan people
21st-century Venezuelan people